This article lists the destinations that Transaero Airlines served near the end of its operations in 2015. All services were terminated with the conclusion of the summer flying schedule on October 26, 2015

List

References

External links
Transaero official website
Route list

Lists of airline destinations